Tracadie Beach was a settlement in Gloucester County, New Brunswick.  It is now a part of the Regional Municipality of Grand Tracadie–Sheila.

History

Notable people

See also
List of communities in New Brunswick

References

Neighbourhoods in Grand Tracadie-Sheila
Former municipalities in New Brunswick